The Colorado Senate is the upper house of the Colorado General Assembly, the state legislature of the US state of Colorado. It is composed of 35 members elected from single-member districts, with each district having a population of about 123,000 as of the 2000 census. Senators are elected to four-year terms, and are limited to two consecutive terms in office. Senators who are term-limited become eligible to run again after a one-term (four year) respite.

The Colorado Senate convenes at the State Capitol in Denver.

History
The first meeting of the Colorado General Assembly took place from November 1, 1876, through March 20, 1877. Lafayette Head was the first state senate president.

The lieutenant governor served as Senate President until 1974 when Article V, Section 10 of the state constitution was amended, granting the Colorado Senate the right to elect one of its own members as President. Fred Anderson was the first state senate president elected after the amendment. Ruth Stockton was the first woman to become Senate's president pro tempore, serving from 1979 to 1980.

Terms and qualifications
The Colorado Senate has 35 members elected to four-year terms. State senators are term-limited to two consecutive terms. Term-limited former members can run again after a four-year break. Vacancies in legislative offices are generally filled by political party vacancy committees, rather than special elections. Vacancy appointees who fill the first half of a state senator's term must stand for election at the next even year November election for the remainder of the state senate term for the seat to which the state senator was appointed.

Procedure and powers
With the notable exceptions listed below, the Colorado Senate operates in a manner quite similar to the United States Senate.

Regular sessions are held annually and begin no later than the second Wednesday in January. Regular sessions last no more than 120 days. Special sessions may be called at any time by the governor of Colorado or upon written request of two-thirds of the members of each house, but are infrequent. Some committees of the General Assembly work between sessions and have limited power to take action without General Assembly approval between legislative sessions.

Joint procedural rules of the two chambers require most legislation to be introduced very early in the legislative session each year, and to meet strict deadlines for completion of each step of the legislative process. Joint procedural rules also limit each legislator to introducing five bills per year, subject to certain exceptions for non-binding resolutions, uniform acts, interim committee bills and appropriations bills. Most members of the General Assembly decide which bills they will introduce during the legislative session (or most of them) prior to its commencement, limiting the ability of members to introduce new bills at constituent request once the legislative session has begun.

Most bills adopted by the General Assembly include a "safety clause" (i.e. a legislative declaration that the bill concerns an urgent matter) and take effect on July 1 following the legislative session unless otherwise provided. Some bills are enacted without a "safety clause" which makes it possible to petition to subject those bills to a referendum before they take effect, and have an effective date in August following the legislative session unless otherwise provided.

Colorado's legislature does not have an analog to the filibuster in the United States Senate requiring a supermajority for approval of any matter. The state lieutenant governor does not have the power to preside or break tie votes in either house of the General Assembly. New executive branch rules are reviewed annually by the legislature and the legislature routinely invalidates some of them each year.

The General Assembly does not have a role in the appointment or retention of state judges, although it must authorize the creation of each judgeship.

Many state agencies and programs are subject to "sunset review" and are automatically abolished if the General Assembly does not reauthorize them.

In 1885, the Colorado Senate appointed its first chaplain, Methodist circuit riding missionary, "Father" John Lewis Dyer.

The state budget process
The governor submits a proposed budget to the Joint Budget Committee each year in advance of the year's legislative session. Colorado's fiscal year is from July 1 to June 30.

Bills introduced in the General Assembly are evaluated by the non-partisan state legislative services body for their fiscal impact and must be provided for in appropriations legislation if there is a fiscal impact.

A state budget, called the "LONG Bill" (Legislation on Operations and Normal Governance) is prepared each year by the Joint Budget Committee of the General Assembly. The House and the Senate alternate the job of introducing the long bill and making a first committee review of it. Colorado's state legislature is required to obtain voter approval in order to incur significant debt, to raise taxes, or to increase state constitutional spending limitations. It is also required to comply with a state constitutional spending mandate for K-12 education. The governor has line item veto power over appropriations.

Current makeup
Based on the 2010 census, each state senator represents 143,691 constituents. The 2020 Colorado Elections resulted in the Democratic Party maintaining a majority of seats in the senate. Democrats currently hold a majority in the Senate in the 73rd General Assembly: 21 Democrats and 14 Republicans.

At the 2022 elections 17 senate seats came up for re-election. As a result the composition of the State Senate at the beginning of the 74th General Assembly will likely be 23 Democrats and 12 Republicans.

With the Democratic majority, Steve Fenberg serves as President of the Senate and Dominick Moreno is the Majority Leader.

Composition

Leadership

Members of the Colorado Senate

Past composition of the Senate

See also

Outline of Colorado
Index of Colorado-related articles
State of Colorado
Law and government of Colorado
Governor of Colorado
Lieutenant Governor of Colorado
Colorado General Assembly

Colorado House of Representatives
 List of Colorado state legislatures
Courts of Colorado
Colorado Supreme Court
United States of America
United States Congress
United States congressional delegations from Colorado
List of United States senators from Colorado
Colorado's congressional districts
List of United States representatives from Colorado

References

External links
Colorado State Senate Republicans
Colorado State Senate Democratic Majority
Colorado General Assembly
State Senate of Colorado at Project Vote Smart

1876 establishments in Colorado
 
Senate
State upper houses in the United States